The name Mina has been used for three tropical cyclones in the Philippines  by PAGASA in the Western Pacific Ocean.

Tropical Storm Vamco (2003) (T0311, 12W, Manang) – affected Taiwan and China in 2003.
Typhoon Mitag (2007) (T0723, 24W, Mina) – Struck the Philippines, killed 71, damages from the storm amounted to US$20 million.
 Typhoon Nanmadol (2011) (T1111, 14W, Mina) – hit the Philippines killing 26, and causing widespread damage worth US$26million; later made landfall on Taiwan and on Fujian, China.

PAGASA retired Mina from its naming list following the 2011 typhoon season and replaced it with Marilyn.

Pacific typhoon set index articles